Elections to the Adur District Council were held on 5 May 1983, with one third of the council up for election. There was an additional vacancy in the Peverel ward and no elections for the Marine ward. Overall turnout climbed to 47.6%.

The election resulted in the Alliance losing control of the council to no overall control.

Election result

This resulted in the following composition of the council:

Ward results

+/- figures represent changes from the last time these wards were contested.

References

1983
1983 English local elections
1980s in West Sussex